Höchstenbach is an Ortsgemeinde – a community belonging to a Verbandsgemeinde – in the Westerwaldkreis in Rhineland-Palatinate, Germany. The community belongs to the Verbandsgemeinde of Hachenburg, a kind of collective municipality. Its seat is in the like-named town.

Geography

The community lies in the Westerwald between Limburg and Siegen in the Wied Valley. Through the community flows the river Wied.

History
On 27 May 1269, Höchstenbach had its first documentary mention.

Politics

The municipal council is made up of 11 council members, including the extraofficial mayor (Bürgermeister), who were elected in a majority vote in a municipal election on 13 June 2004.

Culture and sightseeing

Worth seeing is the village church built in the early 13th century in Romanesque transition style. Within the church are found valuable Early Gothic frescoes.

Economy and infrastructure

The community lies at the crossroads of Bundesstraßen 8, leading from Limburg an der Lahn to Siegburg, and 413 from Bendorf (near Koblenz) to Hachenburg. The nearest Autobahn interchanges are in Dierdorf and Mogendorf on the A 3 (Cologne–Frankfurt), some 20 km away. The nearest InterCityExpress stop is the railway station at Montabaur on the Cologne-Frankfurt high-speed rail line.

Notable people 
 Andreas Balzar (known as Balzar of Flammersfeld, 1769–1797) poacher, robber and Freischärler who fought the French

References

Municipalities in Rhineland-Palatinate
Westerwaldkreis